Marcel Mahouvé (born 16 January 1973) is a Cameroonian former professional footballer who played as a midfielder. He is a cousin of the mother of the Berlin-born siblings Francis, Sylvie and, Nicole Banecki.

Mahouvé played for Tonnerre Yaounde, Dynamo Douala, Putra Samarinda, Montpellier HSC, Clermont Foot Auvergne, FC Inter Turku, Hamilton Academical and 1. FC Saarbrücken.  He was also playing for SS Capricorne in the Réunion Premier League. Mahouvé finally joined Persita Tangerang, one of the Liga Indonesia clubs.

He played for Cameroon national football team and was a participant at the 1998 FIFA World Cup. He also holds a French passport. He was part of the victorious 2000 African Cup of Nations squad.

He is now playing as an amateur for the FC Miami City Champions in Miami the USL Premier Development League (PDL), the fourth tier of the American Soccer Pyramid, in the Southeast Division.

Honours
Montpellier
UEFA Intertoto Cup: 1999

Cameroon
2000 African Cup of Nations

References

External links
 

Living people
1973 births
Footballers from Douala
Association football midfielders
Cameroonian footballers
Cameroon international footballers
Tonnerre Yaoundé players
Montpellier HSC players
1996 African Cup of Nations players
1998 FIFA World Cup players
2000 African Cup of Nations players
Hamilton Academical F.C. players
1. FC Saarbrücken players
Clermont Foot players
FC Inter Turku players
Ligue 1 players
Veikkausliiga players
2. Bundesliga players
Scottish Professional Football League players
Cameroonian expatriate footballers
Expatriate footballers in France
Expatriate footballers in Germany
Cameroonian expatriate sportspeople in Finland
Cameroonian expatriate sportspeople in France
Cameroonian expatriate sportspeople in Germany
Cameroonian expatriate sportspeople in Indonesia
Cameroonian expatriate sportspeople in Scotland
Expatriate footballers in Finland
Expatriate footballers in Scotland
Expatriate footballers in Réunion
Expatriate footballers in Indonesia